Denis Hughson (born 30 August 1944) is  a former Australian rules footballer who played with Fitzroy in the Victorian Football League (VFL).

Notes

External links 
		

Living people
1944 births
Australian rules footballers from Melbourne
Fitzroy Football Club players
South Warrnambool Football Club players